Augustus Everaerts (born 2 February 1929) was a Belgian former wrestler. He competed in the men's freestyle middleweight at the 1952 Summer Olympics.

References

External links
 

1929 births
Living people
Belgian male sport wrestlers
Olympic wrestlers of Belgium
Wrestlers at the 1952 Summer Olympics
Sportspeople from Antwerp Province